Stonefest (sometimes referred to as Stone Week) is an annual festival held at the University of Canberra during week eleven of the second semester to celebrate the laying of the university's Foundation Stone. Stonefest is run by UC Live - the music and live entertainment division of the UCX (the University of Canberra Union), who have been responsible for the event for its entire life span.

History
Stone Day started as a celebration at the University of Canberra held annually to mark the laying of the foundation stone by Prime Minister John Gorton on 28 October 1968. This founded the Canberra College of Advanced Education, which became the University of Canberra in 1990.

The first foundation celebrations were held in 1971. In 1973 Stone Day celebrations were held over two days, which was expanded to take up a whole week in 1976. In the 1980s and 1990s Stoneweek became a popular Canberra entertainment event. In the 1990s it was given themes such as "Return to Woodstock", "Circus", "Back to the Beach", "Alien Abduction", "Oktoberfest", "Halloween" and "Stoneage". In the year 2000 the festival became Stonefest.

For many years Stonefest was the largest music festival in Canberra and a popular one in Australia. In recent years other festivals have made their way onto the Canberra scene, including Groovin' The Moo (also on the University of Canberra Campus) and Foreshore Summer Music Festival, contributing to declining numbers for Stonefest. In 2012, organisers made the decision to return the festival to its roots as a university celebration, re-branding the event as Stone Day, giving it a fresh new look and feel and returning tickets to the student-friendly price of $25.

In June 2019, Stonefest social media channels became active after a long hiatus, teasing the festival's return. On 11 June the lineup for Stonefest 2019 was announced, featuring artists from the local Canberra area, wider Australian music scene and a notable international artist in Example.

Stonefest will return in 2022; since 2020, it has been on hiatus on grounds of COVID-19 pandemic.

Past lineups

2001
"Super Heroes".
Artists included:
The Cruel Sea

2002
"A New Frontier".
Artists included:
TISM - one of the band members famously climbed up onto a nearby balcony totally nude.
Machine Gun Fellatio
Waikiki
Little Smoke
Groove Terminator
 Mikah FreemaN
 Jono Fernandez
 Archie

2003
"Batteries Included".
Friday 31 October - Saturday 1 November 2003
Superstage(on the lawns outside UCU Bar), The Hub (Friday Only), The Arena (UC Refectory)(Friday Only)
Artists included:
 1 November: Regurgitator, 28 Days, Magic Dirt, Gerling, For Amusement Only, Epicure, Love Outside Andromeda (known then as just Andromeda)
 31 October: Resin Dogs, Zephyr Timbre, Biftek, Koolism, Kid Kenobi with MC Shureshock, The Herd, Spod, Karton, Chris Fraser, Groove Terminator, Archie, Nervous, Katch, Hyperion, Typhonic, Brewster B, Anjay, Bec Paton

2004
"The Proud, The Loud, The Many" (featuring an oriental theme).
Superstage(on the lawns outside UCU Bar), The Hub (Friday Only), The Arena (UC Refectory)(Friday Only)
Artists included:
Something for Kate
Von Bondies
Groove Armada
Butterfingers
Rocket Science

2005

"Your Own Wonderland" headlined by The Living End.
Friday 28 October - Saturday 29 October 2005
Superstage(on the lawns outside UCU Bar), The Hub (Friday Only), The Arena (UC Refectory)(Friday Only)
Artists included:
Friday 28 October: Decoder Ring, The Presets, Greg Packer, Cabin Crew
Saturday 29 October: Butterfingers, Thirsty Merc, The Beautiful Girls, Detroit band Electric Six, Casual Projects and The Living End

2006
"Your Own Backyard" headlined by Hoodoo Gurus headlined the 2006 festival.
Friday 27 October-Saturday 28 October 2006
Superstage(on the lawns outside UCU Bar), The Arena (UC Refectory)(Friday Only)
Changes to the organisation of the festival saw the omission of The Hub as a stage.
Artists included:
Regurgitator
The Herd
Kid Kenobi
Urge Overkill
Sarah Blasko
The Avalanches
The Hoodoo Gurus

2007
"Carnivàle"
Friday 26 October-Saturday 27 October 2007
Superstage (on the lawns outside UCU Bar), The Hub (Friday Only), The Arena (UC Refectory) (Friday Only)
2007 saw the return of The Hub stage.
Artists included:
Butterfingers
Cut Copy
Expatriate
Scribe
Paul Kelly
The Waifs
The Mess Hall
 Grand Fatal
Young and Restless
Milkbar Nick

2008
"Celebrating 40 Years"
Superstage(moved to Oval 1), The Arena (UC Refectory)(Friday Only)
Changes to the organisation of the festival saw the end of The Hub as a stage.
Artists included:
Regurgitator
Kora
The Grates
Faker - vocalist Nathan Hudson in usual style climbed the stage's structure multiple times
Blue King Brown
The Dandy Warhols
Grinspoon
 plus others

2009
"Halloween"
Saturday 31 October
Superstage (Oval 1), The Bally (Circus and Freakshow performances)
In 2009 Stonefest turned into a one-day festival in order to deliver a lineup that competed with the other 1 day music festivals recently introduced into the Canberra market in Trackside and Foreshore Summer Music Festival.
Artists included:
The Living End
Birds of Tokyo
Josh Pyke
Frenzal Rhomb - guitarist Lindsay "The Doctor" McDougall stapled his set list to a freakshow performer's chest during their set, while lead man Jay Whalley walked over a girl while she lay on glass.
British India
Children Collide
Urthboy
Art vs. Science
 MM9
 Jericco
 Ashleigh Mannix
 Hancock Basement

2010
"Turn Up The Heat"
Saturday 30 October
The Superstage (Oval 1), The Silent Party
The Silent Party was introduced in 2010 and featured Australia's best indie party DJ's.
Artists included:
Pendulum
Bliss N Eso
Does It Offend You, Yeah?
Spiderbait
Airbourne
Xavier Rudd
Clare Bowditch & The New Slang
Bluejuice
Operator Please
Boy & Bear
Last Dinosaurs
Deep Sea Arcade
 Los Capitanes
 Purple Sneakers DJs
 Silent Party hosted by Funktrust DJs

2019

Saturday 19 October
UC Refectory, UC Hub
Artists included:
Mallrat
Skegss
Example (UK)
British India
Ceres
Thelma Plum
Japanese Wallpaper
Moaning Lisa
Good Doogs
RAAVE Tapes
Cry Club
FRITZ
Genesis Owusu
 Sampa the Great
 Ninajirachi
 Pagan
Teen Jesus and the Jean Teasers
 Sputnik Sweetheart

External links

Events in Canberra
Festivals in Australian Capital Territory
Music festivals in Australia
1968 establishments in Australia
Recurring events established in 1968